Miami Springs Middle School is a secondary school located in the city of Miami Springs, Florida, United States.  Its mascot is the Eagles.

History and information
Miami Springs Middle was built in 1955.

It has been recognized for being a healthy school. President Clinton recognized the school for its healthy reforms at the bronze level.

Children from all over the Miami Metropolitan Area attend. As of 2014, its enrollment was 1,452.

It has a magnet program, specializing in science and engineering, sponsored by MAST Academy. It also has an honors program. It is neighbored by the MDCPS Regional Building, which used to be an elementary school.

Clubs and organizations

Extracurricular groups
500 Role Models
Future Teachers of America (FEA)
Junior Achievement
Memory Book
Multi-Media
National Junior Honor Society
Student Council
Youth Act
Youth Crime Watch

Athletics
The school offers the following athletics:
Basketball - boys'
Basketball - girls'
Cross country - boys'
Cross country - girls'
Soccer - boys'
Soccer - girls'
Softball - boys'
Softball - girls'
Tennis
Track & field - boys'
Track & field - girls'
Volleyball - boys'

Curricular groups
The Geography Team was the 2000 Miami-Dade County second place team, and the 2001 Miami-Dade County first place team, as well as the 2001 Florida State Champions in the National Geographic Bee.

The school has the following curricular groups:
Band
Chorus
Computers
Dance
Drama
Geography
Math
Keyboard
SECME

References

Public middle schools in Florida
Miami-Dade County Public Schools
1955 establishments in Florida
Educational institutions established in 1955
Education in Miami Springs, Florida